
Gmina Przasnysz is a rural gmina (administrative district) in Przasnysz County, Masovian Voivodeship, in east-central Poland. Its seat is the town of Przasnysz, although the town is not part of the territory of the gmina.

Villages
Gmina Przasnysz contains the villages and settlements of Annopol, Bartniki, Bogate, Brzezice, Cegielnia, Cierpigórz, Dębiny, Dobrzankowo, Emowo, Fijałkowo, Frankowo, Golany, Góry Karwackie, Gostkowo, Grabowo, Helenowo-Gadomiec, Janin, Józefowo, Karbówko, Karwacz, Kijewice, Klewki, Księstwo, Leszno, Lisiogóra, Mchówko, Mchowo, Mirów, Nowa Krępa, Nowe Helenowo, Obrąb, Oględa, Osówiec Kmiecy, Osówiec Szlachecki, Patołęka, Polny Młyn, Sątrzaska, Sierakowo, Stara Krępa, Stare Helenowo, Święte Miejsce, Szla, Trzcianka, Wandolin, Wielodróż, Wygoda, Wyrąb Karwacki, Zakocie and Zawadki.

Neighbouring gminas
Gmina Przasnysz is bordered by the town of Przasnysz and by the gminas of Czernice Borowe, Jednorożec, Krasne, Krzynowłoga Mała and Płoniawy-Bramura.

References

Polish official population figures 2006

Przasnysz
Przasnysz County